Iao may refer to:
 IAO (album), an album by avant jazz musician John Zorn
 Iao (Gnosticism), an archon corresponding to Jupiter
 Iao Theater, a theater in Wailuku, Hawaii
 Iao Valley, a tourist attraction in Maui, Hawaii
 Sayak Airport (IATA code: IAO), also known as Siargao Airport, in Surigao del Norte, Philippines
 ιαω, an early Greek form of the tetragrammaton, or name of God

IAO may stand for:

 Incorporated Association Of Organists
 Indian Astronomical Observatory, home of the highest telescope in the world
 Information Awareness Office, a branch of the U.S. Defense Advanced Research Projects Agency (DARPA)
 Interests, Activities, and Opinions - IAO or psychographic variables
 International Accreditation Organization (Houston, TX)
 International Academy of Osteopathy, an international school offering academic training in osteopathy
 International Astronomy Olympiad, an astronomy competition for high-school students
 Interparliamentary Assembly on Orthodoxy, an organization of parliamentarians of the Eastern Orthodox Church
 Institut d'Asie Orientale (Lyons Institute of East Asian Studies), a centre for research in human and social sciences at Université Lumière-Lyon 2 and Institut d'études politiques de Lyon
 Institute for Art and Olfaction, a non-profit organization
 Istituto agronomico per l'oltremare (Overseas Agronomic Institute), a technical and scientific body of the Italian Ministry of Foreign Affairs

See also
 Yao (disambiguation)